Samuel Posin Jacobs is an American journalist. He is the deputy editor for Time magazine.

Biography 
In 2009, Jacobs graduated from Harvard University, where he studied history. The title of his thesis was Walter Weyl and the Progressive Mind: The Promise and Problems of the New Democracy. He was associate managing editor of The Harvard Crimson.

Before coming to Time in 2013, he covered politics for The Daily Beast, edited Newsweek front of the book section, and was a U.S. campaign correspondent for Reuters.

Jacobs was Time senior editor and was promoted in 2014 to assistant managing editor. In 2016, he was promoted to executive editor of Time Digital. He has been deputy editor since 2019.

References

External links
 

Living people
21st-century American journalists
American male journalists
Time (magazine) people
American magazine editors
Harvard College alumni
Year of birth missing (living people)